The East, Central and Southern Africa College of Obstetrics and Gynecology is an autonomous organization that supports postgraduate obstetrics and gynecology education in the region of East, Central, and Southern Africa. ECSACOG offers a qualifying exam that has been internationally benchmarked along with a training curriculum that is standardized. Ethiopia, Kenya, Malawi, Mozambique, Rwanda, South Sudan, Tanzania, Uganda, Zambia, and Zimbabwe are the current ten sub-Saharan nations where ECSACOG conducts operations on a non-profit basis.

See also 

 COSECSA - College of Surgeons of East, Central and Southern Africa
 ECSACOP - East, Central and Southern Africa College of Physicians

References 

Health in Africa
Medical and health organisations based in Uganda
2015 establishments in Uganda